Angela Solita Dimayuga (born 1985) is an American chef and political activist. She was an executive chef at Mission Chinese Food New York, and help build the restaurant in the early years. Dimayuga was included in the Zagat's "30 Under 30" List in 2015 as an upcoming culinary star and was also part of 2015 class of Eater Young Guns. She was nominated for a James Beard Foundation Award in 2016 and named a 2017 Rising Star Chef for her work at Mission Chinese Food New York. As of 2018, she worked with The Standard hotel, which opened in London in 2019.

Biography
Angela Dimayuga was born and raised in San Jose, California into a Filipino-American family, she is one of six siblings. Her father was born in Batangas, Philippines and her mother was born in Pampanga, Philippines, her parents met when her mother was touring with the Filipino national folk dance troupe. She studied hotel and restaurant management at California Polytechnic State University (Cal Poly), and humanities at University of Strathclyde and San Francisco State University (SFSU).

Dimayuga joined the NYC culinary scene in 2007, when she moved to Bedford-Stuyvesant, Brooklyn. At age 22, she started as a line cook at "'Vinegar Hill House" in Brooklyn. She credit's Vinegar Hill House's Jean Adamson as a mentor, who helped launch her career.

She is a multi-disciplinary food industry creative, who worked as Mission Chinese Food's executive chef in New York. She is also a contributor to Bon Appétit magazine, a food stylist, media personality, and interested in the intersection of politics in her work.

In April 2018, Dimayuga was hired as creative director of food and culture for the Standard International hotel group.

Mission Chinese Food 
In 2012 she was cold-called by Danny Bowien to help open the first New York City iteration of his San Francisco restaurant, Mission Chinese Food. Dimayuga helped design the menu and interiors for Bowien's subsequent three Manhattan restaurants: Mission Chinese Food on Orchard St, Mission Cantina, and the new Mission Chinese Food (after the closure of the Orchard Street location) on East Broadway.

Dipping into her Filipino roots, Dimayuga's menu at Mission Chinese Food was what she called "New American"; a cuisine not simply about Asian fusion or even Asian-American, but rather, reflective of the kind of hybrid dining, relevant to today's New Yorkers.

At MCF, Dimayuga was not only the executive chef, but helped to contextualize the restaurant within the culture of the surrounding Lower East Side and Chinatown neighborhoods, through various artist collaborations. Dimayuga commissioned a network of creatives to design work for the restaurant and its external pop-ups and collaborations. In addition, she selected musicians to play in the restaurant, as well as worked with friends and fellow artists to design a signature streetwear line for the restaurant.

In late October 2017, she resigned from Mission Chinese Food claiming "[her] sphere of ambition is just different and bigger."

IvankaTrump.com 
In 2017, she was contacted by the website IvankaTrump.com asking if she would be willing to do an interview, this interaction had "a viral response" after it was posted on Instagram. Dimayuga wrote with help from activist Shakirah Simley, a thoughtful response turning down the offer and her reasons why. She was quoted as saying:

Notable collaborations and events
Dimayuga has worked with and created collaborations and pop-ups for La Buvette, restaurant Noma, Le Chateaubriand, Frankie's Prime Meats, Dimes, Lyle's, Pok Pok, Sqirl, Night + Market, Saison, Lil' Deb's Oasis, Attica, Husk, among others. 
 In 2016, Dimayuga appeared on the television show Eat the World with Emeril Lagasse, as herself.
 Working with MCF's beverage director, Sam Anderson, she designed the sets for the beverage experience for Red Bull Music Academy New York's 2017 festival. Events included Fluxo: Funk Proibidão, Trade Show USA, and Sacred Bones 10 Year Anniversary.
 Working with Opening Ceremony over a number of collaborations over the years, designing "The Dip Jean," with Alex Aiku, and a dinner for Creative Time's annual benefit dinner in 2017.
 Collaborating on an insect and food-related editorial shoot with artist Anicka Yi (2016 Hugo Boss Prize Winner) for the September issue "A Magazine Curated By" Eckhaus Latta 
 Working with Felix Burrichter and Michael Bullock (Editors of PIN-UP magazine), for a Design Week 2017 pop-up called "Rear View".
 In 2017, the Massachusetts Institute of Technology (MIT) Media Lab and Dimayuga are working together on a creating fermentation boxes and related health protocols for restaurants.
 Dimayuga paired up in cooking with Dominique Crenn at the 2017 Harlem EatUp!, an annual food festival in Harlem, New York.
 She has done event work for City Harvest, Tasting Table, Food Book Fair and many more.
 She has appeared the podcast on the Heritage Radio Network, Radio Cherry Bombe: Episode 87: New York's Next Wave.

Awards
Under her watch, MCF was awarded 2 stars and "Restaurant of the Year" in 2012 by The New York Times. In 2015, she was named "Best Chef" by New York. The James Beard Foundation named her a "rising star chef" in 2016. In 2017, StarChefs publication named her one of their rising stars.

In 2016, she was the keynote speaker at Restaurant noma's global, "MAD Food Symposium". Her speech, "Burning the Candle at Both Ends," focused on the maintenance of work and life balance as a chef.

See also
 Filipinos in the New York metropolitan area
 LGBT culture in New York City
 List of LGBT people from New York City
 New Yorkers in journalism

References

External links
 "Mission Chinese Food Chef Angela Dimayuga’s Pantry Is All About the Fancy Snacks" from GQ magazine, April 2017

Living people
American chefs
American women chefs
1985 births
People from San Jose, California
Bon Appétit people
LGBT people from California
American people of Filipino descent
California Polytechnic State University alumni
Alumni of the University of Strathclyde
San Francisco State University alumni
American LGBT people of Asian descent
21st-century American LGBT people
21st-century American women
LGBT chefs